William Derek Grimm (born August 3, 1974) is an American professional basketball player.

A 6'9" forward from the University of Missouri, Grimm was never drafted by a National Basketball Association (NBA) team but did play for the Sacramento Kings during the 1997–98 NBA season. He appeared in nine games and scored a total of 14 points. Born in Peoria, Illinois, he was selected by the La Crosse Bobcats in the fifth round (50th overall) of the 1997 CBA Draft. He also played with the CBA's Dakota Wizards in 2003 and with the Gary Steelheads in 2005.

He has also played professionally in the IBL, Serbia (Kosovo), Philippines, Poland, Netherlands, and Japan.

Notes

External links 
 NBA stats @ basketballreference.com
 YouTube Video of Tyus Edney's winning shot against Missouri in 1995 NCAA Tournament

1974 births
Living people
African-American basketball players
American expatriate basketball people in Japan
American expatriate basketball people in the Netherlands
American expatriate basketball people in the Philippines
American expatriate basketball people in Poland
American expatriate basketball people in Serbia
American men's basketball players
Basketball players from Illinois
Dakota Wizards (CBA) players
Missouri Tigers men's basketball players
Power forwards (basketball)
Sacramento Kings players
Small forwards
Sportspeople from Peoria, Illinois
St. Louis Swarm players
Sun Rockers Shibuya players
Undrafted National Basketball Association players
Philippine Basketball Association imports
Shell Turbo Chargers players